Fowlerton is a census-designated place (CDP) in La Salle County, Texas, United States. Its population was 55 at the 2010 census.

History
Fowlerton is named for two brothers who settled the community about 1910. By 1914, Fowlerton peaked in population at around 1,000, and had telephone service. Farmers faced droughts and low prices. The Fowler brothers had described themselves as "colonizers" and widely advertised the town. They soon faced lawsuits from disgruntled settlers. By 1925, the population had declined to about 600, and never recovered. The San Antonio, Uvalde and Gulf Railroad, now part of Union Pacific, brought only temporary prosperity to Fowlerton.

Geography
Fowlerton is located in northeastern La Salle County at  (28.464840, -98.811642). It is bordered to the east by McMullen County. Texas State Highway 97 passes through the community, leading north  to Charlotte and west  to Cotulla.

The Frio River runs along the northern edge of the community, leading east to the Nueces River at Three Rivers.

Demographics
As of the census of 2000,  62 people and 18 families, and 28 households were residing in the Fowlerton CDP. The population density was 28.5 people per mi2 (11.0/km2). The 45 housing units averaged 20.7/mi2 (8.0/km2). The racial makeup of the CDP was 95.16% White and 4.84% from other races. Hispanics or Latinos of any race were 24.19% of the population.

Of the 28 households, 25.0% had children under the age of 18 living with them, 60.7% were married couples living together, 3.6% had a female householder with no husband present, and 35.7% were not families. About 35.7% of all households were made up of individuals, and 14.3% had someone living alone who was 65 years of age or older. The average household size was 2.21, and the average family size was 2.89.

In the CDP, the age distribution was 25.8% under 18, 1.6% from 18 to 24, 22.6% from 25 to 44, 33.9% from 45 to 64, and 16.1% who were 65 or older. The median age was 46 years. For every 100 females, there were 87.9 males. For every 100 females age 18 and over, there were 76.9 males.

The median income for a household in the CDP was $19,107, and for a family was $23,750. Males had a median income of $0 versus $40,417 for females. The per capita income for the CDP was $16,497. No families and 8.5% of the population were living below the poverty line, including no one under 18 or over 64.

Education
Fowlerton is served by the Cotulla Independent School District, but most pupils transfer to McMullen County High School in Tilden.

Climate
The climate in this area is characterized by hot, humid summers and generally mild to cool winters. According to the Köppen climate classification, Fowlerton has a humid subtropical climate, Cfa on climate maps.

References

Census-designated places in La Salle County, Texas
Census-designated places in Texas